Xurs (also, Khurs and Khurst) is a village and municipality in the Ordubad District of Nakhchivan, Azerbaijan. It is located in the near of the Ordubad-Nurgut highway, in the north-west from the district center. Its population is busy with gardening, beekeeping, animal husbandry. There are secondary school, club and a medical center in the village. It has a population of 156.

Etymology
The researchers believe that this name is a variant of the ethnonym of Gorus. According to the sources, in the 16th century the goruslar, one of the cattle-breeder tribes were part of the tribes of Qizilbash. After been settled a part of them in Shirvan by the Safavid shahs, they have spread to the different zones.

References

External links 

Populated places in Ordubad District
Villages in Azerbaijan